The A22 is a future Motorway planned to bypass the capital of Cyprus, Nicosia starting from the industrial zone of Dali to the A9 near Nicosia International Airport. This road is in the process of final plans.

See also 
 A1 motorway (Cyprus)
 A2 motorway (Cyprus)
 A3 motorway (Cyprus)
 A4 motorway (Cyprus)
 A5 motorway (Cyprus)
 A6 motorway (Cyprus)
 A7 motorway (Cyprus)

References 

Motorways and roads in Cyprus
Limited-access roads
Proposed roads
Proposed transport infrastructure in Cyprus